Thomas Robertson Parker (13 February 1924 – 1996) was a professional footballer. He was born in Hartlepool.

He played in midfield for Ipswich Town F.C. His career started at Ipswich Town in 1946 where he became the club captain until he retired in 1957 after playing 475 competitive games for the club.

Parker was stationed as a sailor at the nearby HMS Ganges training camp at Shotley, Suffolk. He helped raise funds for the football club through the Development Association. Tommy was a keen trout fisherman, and died in 1996.

Honours
Ipswich Town
Football League Third Division South: 1953–54, 1956–57

Individual
Ipswich Town Hall of Fame: Inducted 2010

See also
List of one-club men in association football

References

Tommy Parker's profile at Pride of Anglia

1924 births
1996 deaths
Ipswich Town F.C. players
Footballers from Suffolk
Sportspeople from Ipswich
Association football midfielders
English footballers